Zawidz Kościelny railway station is a railway station in Zawidz Kościelny, Sierpc, Masovian, Poland. It is served by Koleje Mazowieckie.

References
Station article at kolej.one.pl

External links

Railway stations in Warsaw